Eolacertilia ("dawn lizards") is an extinct clade of lepidosauriform diapsid reptiles known from the Late Permian to the Late Triassic. It is uncertain as to whether they are a natural group and it has been suggested that they form a "waste basket" taxon. Currently, the only members of the group are Paliguana and Kuehneosauridae. Other genera were transferred to basal groups within Diapsida (such as Palaeagama and Saurosternon),  Archosauromorpha (Tanystropheus and Cteniogenys).

References 

Prehistoric reptiles
Early Triassic first appearances
Late Triassic extinctions